WYNG or Wyng may refer to:

 Wyng, a location in Scotland
 WYNG (FM), a radio station (94.9 FM) licensed to serve Mt. Carmel, Illinois, United States
 Wing, Buckinghamshire